Merku Thodarchi Malai is a 2018 Indian Tamil language drama film. It was directed by Lenin Bharathi and produced by Vijay Sethupathi, with cinematographer Theni Eswar and composer Ilaiyaraaja. This is said to be Ilaiyaraaja's 1001th film signed by him in 2015.

The film revolves around the life and times of a group of landless workers living along the foothills of the Western Ghats in India. It depicts how the introduction of commercialization creates conflict in the simple lives of the villagers.

Plot 

Daily wage laborer Rengasamy makes a living carrying cardamom sacks from the mountains to the foothills of the Western Ghats in the interior of Tamil Nadu. Chacko, a communist from Kerala, unionizes these workers to prevent the estate owner from exploiting them. As a result, there are frequent clashes between the landlord and the union members.

Rengasamy wants to buy a piece of land from a local, but fails due to objections from the seller's family. He marries his cousin Eshwari, who is a worker on the estate, and joins her union. His second attempt to buy land ends in unexpected tragedy and he loses most of his savings. He later acquires land with a loan and begins farming to pay back the debt.

Meanwhile, in the communist party office, Chacko has a heated debate with a senior comrade about industrialization and the workers' conditions. Another comrade sends Chacko to deliver a message, and while he is away the estate owner closes the estate to make the workers and union members suffer. When Chako returns, the estate owner mocks him, saying that he had plotted with the senior comrade for this purpose.

Angered, Chacko finds the workers who are preparing to leave. He gathers a few of them, including Rengasamy, to take up weapons and confront the estate owner. The mob finds the estate owner with the senior comrade, kill both of them, and are jailed for several years. When Rengasamy returns home, the fertilizer vendor forecloses on his land for outstanding debts. Rengasamy later becomes a security guard for a windmill constructed on the land he once owned.

Cast 
 Antony as Rangasamy alias Rangu
 Gayathri Krishnaa as Eshwari
 Abu Valayankulam as Chako
 Anthony Vaathiyar as Kangaani
 Sornam as Bakkiyam
 Aarubala as Ravi
 'Late' M.S. Lai (a) Sudalai
 Uoothu Rasa
 Thevaram Sornam
 Kodangipatti Mokkathayi
 Pallavarayan Patti Pandi
 Vanaraj
 Master Smith
 Theni Eswar

Production 

Lenin Bharathi, who previously wrote the screenplay for Aadhalal Kadhal Seiveer, made his directorial debut with this film.  The film was outlined to Vijay Sethupathi about a year before production, gaining his interest in the project. The shooting for the film began in January or February 2016.

The production budget of the film was  2.3 crore (23 million rupees).

Soundtrack
"Kekkatha Vathiyam" - Ilaiyaraaja, Ramya NSK - Yugabharathi
"Andarathil Thonguthamma" - Haricharan - Ilaiyaraaja

Release
The satellite rights of the film were sold to Kalaignar TV.

Reception

Critical response
The Times of India gave the film three-and-a-half out of five stars and wrote that "The film ends with a bang ... even as it subtly delivers its message - how development also leads to the destruction of a way of life and a community".

Awards and nominations 

 The film was screened during the 21st International Film Festival of Kerala.
 The film won Best Cinematography at the Bioscope Global Film Festival, Punjab.
 The film has been nominated for 'Best Screenplay' Category in 17th New York Indian Film Festival (NYIFF2017).
 The film was screened at the Singapore South Asian International Film Festival and Chicago South Asian Film Festival.
 The film was invited to the 6th edition of Toulouse Indian Film Festival in France to complete for both the Jury and Audience Prizes.

References

External links 

Films scored by Ilaiyaraaja
2010s Tamil-language films
2016 films